Prabhjot Singh (born August 20, 1982) is an American scientist, physician and healthcare researcher. 

He is Associate Professor in the Departments of Health System Design and Global Health and Medicine at the Mount Sinai Health System and Icahn School of Medicine, as well as Special Advisor for Strategy and Design at the Peterson Center for Healthcare. His work has focused on how advances in community health systems globally can improve health in America.

Singh is the author of more than 25 academic papers on a variety of subjects including healthcare delivery to impoverished communities.

Early life and education
Singh was raised in Kenya and earned a BA and BS in Biology from the University of Rochester, where he graduated magna cum laude, Phi Beta Kappa and earned a Barry M. Goldwater Scholarship.

He went on to pursue a combined MD/PhD at Weill Cornell Medical College Rockefeller University, with a Post-Doctoral fellowship in Sustainable Development at Columbia University, supported by a Paul and Daisy Soros Fellowship, NIH Medical Scientist Training Program Fellowship. He completed his clinical training in Internal Medicine at Mount Sinai Hospital in Manhattan, Elmhurst Hospital in Queens, and the James J. Peters VA Medical Center in the Bronx. As he was completing his clinical training, he was recognized as a Robert Wood Johnson Foundation 40th Anniversary Young Leader for his work on adapting global insights into health system design to domestic contexts. He gave a TEDx talk on the topic in 2010, and at Mayo Transform in 2014.

Career
Singh was an assistant professor of International and Public Affairs at Columbia University and Director of Systems Design at The Earth Institute. In 2013, he co-founded the One Million Community Health Worker Campaign with Jeffrey Sachs, which is an initiative of the African Union and UN Sustainable Development Solutions Network.

Singh was named as Director of the Arnhold Institute and Chair of the Department of Health System Design & Global Health at Mount Sinai Health Systems in 2016. The Arnhold Institute was supported with a gift of $27.5 million, and in 2016, his Arnhold Institute team, in partnership with the UN Special Envoy for Health In Agenda 2030 and partners, launched Atlas, which leverages satellite technologies to create a new generation of spatial information systems that push intelligence to frontline health care workers in information poor regions. This software has yet to be deployed or used by any frontline health care workers.

Domestically, in his role as Vice Chairman of Medicine for Population Health, Dr. Singh supported the development of a primary care practice transformation team in partnership with health system leaders. 

In 2011, Singh and his wife, Manmeet Kaur, founded City Health Works, a program to build a financially sustainable and scalable platform for health coaches to improve the outcomes and decrease the costs of care for high need patients.

Singh has a particular interest in developing the capacity for intermediaries to form bridges between healthcare and social care.

In 2016, the Mount Sinai Health System Dean, CEO and Board of Trustees approved the creation of the Department of Health System Design and Global Health with Singh as chair. He also serves on the National Academy of Medicine’s forum on Aging, Independence and Disability, as well as the National Quality Forum’s taskforce on the impact of housing instability and food insecurity on health. He is a term member of the Council on Foreign Relations. In 2017, he became a Presidential Leadership Scholar and in 2018, he became a Fellow of the Committee on Global Thought at Columbia University.

In 2018, the Robert Wood Johnson Foundation announced that he was elected to their Board of Trustees.

His work has been featured in The Lancet, The New England Journal of Medicine, Brookings Institution Economic Studies, and Health Affairs, as well as by media outlets such as NPR  and the New York Times.

Social advocacy
Singh has written about issues related to hate crimes, building more resilient communities, and equal opportunity to work. He was attacked in a 2013 hate crime that received extensive local, national and international  press, both for the attack itself as well as his response.  The LA Times, Christian Science Monitor, The Guardian and Al Jazeera have cited him on Sikhs in America. In 2014, Columbia University Magazine wrote a feature story about Prabhjot Singh and Manmeet Kaur's relationship, work in healthcare, and social activism. He serves on the Board of Directors for the Auburn Seminary and Kaur Life.

In 2017, Singh provided testimony to the United States Senate Judiciary Committee on the rising incidence of religious hate crimes.

Books 

 Panjabi, Raj., Singh, Prabhjot. The Last Mile: How to Get Health Care to the Places That Need It Most. United States: Columbia University Press, 2020.
 Singh, Prabhjot. Dying and Living in the Neighborhood: A Street-Level View of America’s Healthcare Promise. United States: Johns Hopkins University Press, 2016

Select Publications 

 1 million community health workers in sub-Saharan Africa by 2015; P Singh, JD Sachs - The Lancet, 2013
 Deployment of community health workers across rural sub-Saharan Africa: financial considerations and operational assumptions; GC McCord, A Liu, P Singh - Bulletin of the World Health Organization, 2013
 Accelerating Adoption And Diffusion Of Innovations In Care Delivery, Health Affairs, May 2017.
 How to Build Sustainable Community Health Programs in the United States, Health Affairs, 2017
 Trust between health care and community organizations, SS Stout, LA Simpson, P Singh - JAMA, 2019
 Community Health Workers in Global Health: Scale and Scalability, A Liu, S Sullivan, M Khan, S Sachs, P Singh - Mount Sinai Journal of Medicine: A Journal of Translational and Personalized Medicine, 2011
 Health in a Time of Ebola, Project Syndicate, 2014
 Community Health Workers — A Local Solution to a Global Problem, Prabhjot Singh, Dave A. Chokshi - The New England Journal of Medicine, September 2013

2019 Lawsuit
In April 2019, Mount Sinai Health Systems was sued for gender and age discrimination. Four people at Mount Sinai, including Singh, were named as defendants. As a result of the lawsuit, Singh stepped down from his positions as Chairman of the Arnhold Institute for Global Health and chairman of the department of health system design and global health at the Icahn School of Medicine at Mount Sinai, where he remains on the faculty.

References

Living people
1982 births
University of Rochester alumni
Weill Cornell Medical College alumni
Rockefeller University alumni
Columbia University alumni
Columbia University faculty